Barbatula eregliensis is a species of ray-finned fish in the family Balitoridae. It is found only in Turkey. Its natural habitats are swamps and freshwater lakes. It is threatened by habitat loss.

References

Sources 

eregliensis
Endemic fauna of Turkey
Fish described in 1978
Taxonomy articles created by Polbot